Mortenson Broadcasting was an independent media company based in Lexington, Kentucky.  Mortenson primarily owned Christian radio stations in several market areas.

Mortenson Broadcasting Company began with the vision of Jack M. Mortenson and his late father, Dr. E. M. Mortenson. After several very successful joint ventures, including the start-up and pastorship of Faith Memorial Baptist Church in Canton, Ohio, Jack re-directed his career to focus exclusively on the development of his network of Christian radio stations after the death of his father in 1970.

Stations formerly owned

Dallas/Fort Worth, Texas
 KHVN - (under ownership of iHeartMedia)
 KTNO - (under ownership of Relevant Radio)
 KRVA - (under ownership of LRAD Media)
 KKGM - (under ownership of iHeartMedia)
 KGGR - (under ownership of MARC Radio Group)

Kansas City, Missouri
 KGGN - (under ownership of Catholic Radio Network, Inc.)

Huntington, West Virginia
 WEMM-FM - (under ownership of Bristol Broadcasting Company)
 WRWB - (under ownership of Bristol Broadcasting Company)

References

External links
Official site

Companies based in Lexington, Kentucky
Defunct radio broadcasting companies of the United States